Verticordia endlicheriana var. endlicherliana is a flowering plant in the myrtle family, Myrtaceae and is endemic to the south-west of Western Australia. It is a small, compact shrub with mostly narrow leaves and golden-yellow flowers which age to reddish brown.

Description

Flowering occurs from August to November.

Taxonomy and naming
The species Verticordia endlicheriana was first formally described by Johannes Conrad Schauer in 1844 and the description was published in Lehmann's Plantae Preissianae. In 1991, Alex George undertook a review of the genus Verticordia and described five varieties of Verticordia endlicheriana including this variety.

Distribution and habitat
This variety grows in sand with gravel, loam or clay near granite outcrops in heath and wandoo woodland. It occurs in areas between the Beaufort River, Cranbrook, Tambellup, Albany and the Arthur River with disjunct populations near Corrigin, Kulin, Koonadgin and Mount Hampton. There areas are within the Avon Wheatbelt, Esperance Plains, Jarrah Forest and Mallee biogeographic regions.

Conservation
Verticordia endlicheriana var. endlicheriana is classified as "not threatened" by the Western Australian Government Department of Parks and Wildlife.

Use in horticulture
This variety is well-established in gardens and some specimens have grown for more than 9 years. It has usually been propagated from cuttings and has been grown in a range of soils, although it is usually slow-growing. A light annual pruning encourages the production of flowers.

References

endlicheriana var. endlicheriana
Rosids of Western Australia
Eudicots of Western Australia
Plants described in 1844